Bertrand is a 1964 Australian television film. It aired on non-commercial ABC in a 60-minute time-slot. It was written by Romilly Cavan, and produced by Ken Hannam. The film aired on 27 May 1964 in Sydney 12 August 1964 in Melbourne and on 2 September 1964 in Brisbane.

Plot
Set in Sydney, the title character of the drama was a stray cat, who brings together three people, a teenager (Michael Thomas), a recluse (Ronald Morse) and an ex-suffragette (Eve Wynne).

Cast
Michael Thomas as Albert Watson
Ronald Morse as Tracey
Eve Wynne as Mrs Glover

Production
It was originally written for British television and set in Britain.

The setting was relocated to Australia for this version. The designer was Geoffrey Wedlock. His neighbour, N Jenkins, owned a cat, Tim, who was cast in the lead role. "You'd have thought he'd been around TV studios all his life," said Mrs Jenkins. "He did everything... on cue."

Reception
The Sydney Morning Herald called it over long "and tedious" and felt adapting the story to Australia was a mistake.

References

External links

1964 television films
1964 films
Australian drama television films
Australian Broadcasting Corporation original programming
English-language television shows
Black-and-white Australian television shows
Australian television plays
Films directed by Ken Hannam